Bells Are Ringing (full title Modern Jazz Performances of Songs from Bells Are Ringing) is an album by drummer Shelly Manne's group Shelly Manne & His Friends, with pianist André Previn and bassist Red Mitchell. It was recorded in 1958 and released on the Contemporary label. The album features Manne's jazz interpretations of songs from Jule Styne, Betty Comden, and Adolph Green's broadway musical, Bells Are Ringing and followed the success of Manne's 1956 album, My Fair Lady. The album appeared a year prior to the release of the motion picture.

Reception

The AllMusic review by Scott Yanow states: "As is always the case with this group, Previn's piano is the lead voice and his virtuosity, good taste, melodic improvising, and solid sense of swing are chiefly responsible for the music's success".

Track listing
All compositions by Jule Styne, Betty Comden and Adolph Green
 "I Met a Girl" - 3:20
 "Just in Time" - 3:36
 "The Party's Over" [Ballad Version] - 5:15
 "It's a Perfect Relationship" - 5:48
 "Is It a Crime?" - 3:46
 "I Better Think of Her" - 3:08
 "Independent (On My Own)" - 5:58
 "Muchacha" - 4:26
 "Long Before I Knew You" - 4:11
 "The Party's Over" [Up Tempo Version] - 3:59

Personnel
Shelly Manne - drums
André Previn - piano
Red Mitchell - bass

References

1959 albums
Contemporary Records albums
Shelly Manne albums